Einstein's God Model is a 2016 American independent science fiction film written, directed, and edited by Philip T. Johnson. It was produced by Craig Dow, Kenneth Hughes, and Philip T. Johnson.

The film was noted  for its stunning visual effects, original storyline, and innovative portrayal of abstract theoretical physics. The film won multiple awards, including "Best Science" (presented by an M.I.T. professor) at the 2016 Boston Science Fiction Festival, "Best Picture" at the 2016 Comicon, and "Best Metaphysical Science" at the 2016 RAW Science Film Festival. A limited theatrical release, was followed by an international digital release, where it has since gained a cult following on major platforms.

Plot 
The film opens with an actual quote Thomas Edison gave during a 1920 interview with Scientific American Magazine. He stated that he was working on a device that would allow him to communicate with personalities that had passed on to another plane of existence. In 2002, graduate student Craig Leeham volunteers for a clandestine research study. Physicists Louis Mastenbrook and his mentor, Carl Meiselhoff, subject Craig to high levels of infrasound, electromagnetic fields, intravenous Ketamine, and "optical stimulation". The lab equipment is a mashup of vintage electronics from various decades of the 20th century. Craig is wearing glowing goggles and a helmet covered in cables. He answers an old rotary phone and is shocked to hear the voice of his deceased sister (Jenny) on the other end. Meiselhoff and Mastenbrook increase the power on the equipment. Craig seizes, screams, and his eyes explode. Ten years later, at a funeral, anesthetist Brayden Taylor's story is revealed in flashbacks. After surgery, his patient thanks him for allowing her to see her deceased children. An anesthesia colleague, Bob, informs him of the study Meiselhoff did using Ketamine to mimic near death experiences. At a cemetery, Brayden's girlfriend, Abbey, doubles over with abdominal pain while creating gravestone rubbings for her artwork.  Later at a dinner party, Abbey collapses in the bathroom after a miscarriage. Following emergency surgery, Abbey overhears Brayden and Devin talking about the loss of the pregnancy. She flees her hospital room to walk home and is violently struck in a hit and run. Snowfalls as she dies in Brayden's arms. Abbey sees flashes, glowing energy strings, and a pulsing ball of light. She whispers "It's very beautiful over there."

Overwhelmed with grief, Brayden becomes obsessed with trying to bring Abbey back into his life. He seeks out Meiselhoff, and the physicist's widow gives Brayden the equipment with a cryptic warning of losing your soul trying to upset the balance of nature. Brayden tries to operate the Edison gear, but lacking expertise, almost kills himself in the process. He is saved by the arrival of Louis Mastenbrook who explains that he's part of a 100 year old coalition of physicists called "The God Model Project". Their goal is to define the laws of the known universe by the end of the century. At a restaurant, Louis gives Brayden a short lesson on M-Theory and how our universe sits on a giant cosmic membrane, parallel to infinite other universes. The electromagnetic field created by our brain, carries our consciousness on gravitational waves to another membrane. Louis claims not only will he be able to contact Abbey's consciousness on another membrane, he'll be able to bring her back.
Louis instructs Brayden to recruit Craig Leeham, who is now blind, but has the ability to communicate with and see deceased personalities on other membranes. He is also a drunk. At a rural radio station where Craig hosts a call-in medium show, Craig goes into a trance and connects with another membrane to speak with a caller's dead husband. Brayden convinces Craig to join him and Louis in their rogue research. Craig thinks Jenny is trapped between membranes and Louis can help save her. Back at his loft, Brayden asks Louis about the God Model, and Louis relates the story of a Harvard lecture where a student asked Einstein if he believed in God. Einstein drew a diagram on the board illustrating the four areas of physics - Classical, Relativity, Quantum, and Relativistic Quantum. He explained that this represented all our knowledge of the known universe. He drew another box around that diagram and said, this represents all the knowledge we have yet to learn. The student asked Einstein when we would fill in the outer box. Einstein replied, "Never. Because then we'd know everything. Because then we'd be God."

Isolated in a closet, Craig fights to tolerate the machine. Brayden is able to contact Abbey and briefly communicates with her. During the suspenseful session, Abbey melts a bucket of rubbing wax by Brayden. Before losing consciousness, Craig reveals he saw the snowfall present at Abbey's death. Brayden postulates that, if he's put under general anesthesia, he can tolerate even greater levels of the machine and reach Abbey without fear of brain damage. He approaches Devin to join them and perform anesthesia, presenting the melted wax as evidence. Devin admonishes Brayden for getting involved with the two charlatans, and tells him to get back to the real world. Brayden returns to the loft and tells Louis and Craig it's over. Devin soon shows up, to reveal that the melted bucket of wax was a mold and shows them a plaster cast of Abbey's hand wearing the engagement ring Brayden placed on her finger when she died. Brayden is strapped into the gear and Devin induces general anesthesia. Louis cranks up the machine to the highest levels ever. Brayden briefly wakes up from the anesthesia and his consciousness makes a connection with the quantum realm that leads to another membrane. Brayden physically vanishes and finds himself in the "bulk" .. the no man's land between parallel universes. There, he briefly sees a strange figure also wearing the Edison gear. The figure vanishes and Brayden finds himself back in the loft .. but it is dark, empty. Louis and Devin pull the figure out of the isolation closet ... it is Carl Meiselhoff. Meiselhoff had crossed over trying to repair the damage he'd done to Craig's life. Louis reveals he sent Brayden over as a way to retrieve Carl. In the parallel universe, Brayden discovers Jenny, who is holding Abbey's plaster hand. Brayden tries to exit the closet, but is told he can only enter her world when the machine starts. Furious, Devin insists they rescue Brayden. Louis says it's impossible because they'd have to merge membranes. Carl states that Craig is capable of briefly getting the two membranes to occupy the same space, if he goes into his trance while connected to the machine. Craig agrees and he merges the membranes. Brayden enters the loft and is confronted by Abbey's entity (a glowing plasma sphere). Abbey physically appears to Bradyen and they are reunited. Craig himself crosses over and is reunited with Jenny. The merger collapses. Craig and Jenny are thrown into a new universe, as are Brayden and Abbey.

Epilogue reveals Brayden and Abbey in a loving embrace in their new world, Craig and Jenny in their world (as Jenny makes a rubbing of Abbey's gravestone), and Louis being interviewed about his claim that he has seen membranes ... and they are "beautiful".

Cast 

 Aaron Graham as Brayden Taylor
 Kirby O'Connell as Abbey Lucey
 Kenneth Hughes]as Louis Mastenbrook PhD
 Brad Norman as Craig Leeham
 Darryl Warren as Carl Meiselhoff PhD
 Karol Kent as Margaret Meiselhoff
 Tiffany Scott as Donna
 Andy Hannon as Devin
 Mallory Bordonaro as Jenny Leeham
 Darren Stephens as Pastor Dave
 Mike McNamara as Minister
 Jessica Brooks as Waitress
 M.T. Cozzola as Francine (as Mary-Terese Cozzola)
 Thomas Herman as Bob
 Chris Tzoubris as Gordon LaMalfa
 Philip T. Johnson as Sean Fox

Science and physics 

Einstein's God Model wove a variety of theoretical physics, medical science, and historical science into the tapestry of its story. These include:
 String Theory 
 M-Theory 
 Parallel Universes
 General Anesthesia 
 Infrasound (as it affects the human body and visual field) 
 Electromagnetic Fields
 Ketamine  (dissociative effect on the human body and "near death experiences").
 Thomas Edison's  rumored prototype device for contacting other planes of existence.
 Albert Einstein's  guest lecture at Harvard University where he purportedly described the God Model diagram.
 Quantum superposition 
 Quantum Entanglement

Production 
While writing the screenplay, Johnson researched string theory, M-theory, and the nature of consciousness. The Elegant Universe by Brian Greene and Spook by Mary Roach were two of the biggest influences. He also drew from his academic background in science and medicine. The anecdote of Einstein's God Model lecture was related to him by his physics professor Daniel Record (who served as science adviser to the film). The anesthesia story elements were drawn from his career as an anesthetist. William Rosenblatt, M.D. of Yale University served as medical adviser. Producer Kenneth Hughes. also provided feedback and notes during the writing process.

Filming 
The film was shot over six weeks in Chicago, IL during the winter. The work/loft space was rented from West Grand Studios, who also supplied set dressing. The Chicago Film office  assisted with the exterior street shots. The hospital scenes were shot at Robert Morris College's medical training facility. Exterior cemetery and chapel scenes were shot at Bohemian National Cemetery. Like many productions, the film had its struggles at the beginning, but turned a corner after Kenneth Hughes brought Chicago producer Craig Dow of ImageWorks Chicago on board. The original director of photography was replaced with Mike Turano who had the skills to light and shoot with the classic technicolor style that the filmmakers were looking for. The film is often praised for the vintage electronics that are almost a character in and of themselves. Much of the equipment came from the filmmaker's father. The rest were assembled from pieces purchased on ebay and Craigslist.

Post-production 
Johnson and the producers wanted the visual effects (VFX) to have a very visceral feel to offset it from the film market's heavy reliance on digital effects. After producer Kenneth Hughes brought in Erik Tillmans of DreamWorks as visual effects supervisor, the production reached a tipping point as the VFX's developed their own character arc in the story. Most of the VFX were shot analog and enhanced with minimal digital embellishment. The quantum realm and membrane effects were achieved with water tank footage and green screen compositing. The surreal snow that seems to endlessly float was crushed egg shells in baby oil. Screen Anarchy said of the editing "Keen blasts of sharply assembled insert shots and sound are standout aesthetic qualities of the movie." . Producer Kenneth Hughes recruited Senon Williams of the popular band Dengue Fever to create the film's retro/eerie score. The film's fantastic sound design was created by the artists at Technicolor Sound at Paramount Pictures. Johnson stated "It wasn't until I heard the sound effects during the mix that the machine stopped being a prop and became an actual working device."

Release

Critical reception 
After its world premiere at the 2016 Boston Science Fiction Film Festival, Einstein's God Model received generally positive reviews. Its festival run produced multiple awards (see below) and hosted very dynamic Q&A's after each screening. Said Johnson, "The film is so science heavy, I was surprised at how many people were touched by the story on a spiritual level. We had audience members, who had suffered a recent loss, tell us that it gave them comfort.". Einstein's God Model had its theatrical premiere at the Arena Cinelounge Hollywood with a red carpet event attended by many celebrities.

The Los Angeles Times gave Einstein's God Model a certified fresh review on Rotten Tomatoes, stating "Johnson tackles grief, hope, spirituality and the unifying theory of everything. " .  Other reviews include ...

 Jewish News - "There is an integrity to the view the film takes, and one that the film, in its own way displays with visual panache and extraordinary heart."
 eFilm Critic.com - "The movie both has a story that works and has an entertaining style of its own ... Johnson is a bit ahead of the crowd with Einstein's God Model".

Distribution 
Following a theatrical opening in Hollywood, California, Einstein's God Model gained distribution with Indie Rights Movies. The film enjoyed a successful digital release on a wide variety of platforms (Amazon, iTunes, Google Play, VUDU, Tubi TV, and others), and is currently available in the U.S., Great Britain, Australia, Japan, and China. The film is also available on BluRay and DVD, both of which have numerous bonus features such as director/producer/science adviser commentary, interviews, behind the scenes short, etc.   The film has also screened in venues at Yale University, London, and Melbourne. Spanish and French subtitle distribution is pending.

Other facts 
 The film's science adviser, Daniel Record, is a NASA educator, a veteran of the Apollo program, is certified to work with lunar samples, was honored by President Ronald Reagan for the Presidential Award for Excellence in Science Teaching, and was a finalist in the Teacher in Space project
 
 The film's director, Philip T. Johnson has a Masters of Science in Anesthesiology from the University of Southern California Keck School of Medicine and is a staff affiliate at Yale New Haven Hospital. He also attended New York University's intensive film certificate program.
 
 Director Philip T. Johnson and Producer/Actor Kenneth Hughes shared the stage with fellow honorees Nobel Prize in Physics winner   Kip Thorne ("Interstellar") and physicist Stephen Wolfram ("Arrival") at the 2016 RAW Science Film Festival.
The film was recently mentioned alongside indie sci-fi classics Primer and Timecrimes by the Colorado International SciFi & Fantasy Film Festival as an example of the type of smart, complicated, low-budget science fiction films they seek for submissions.
 
 During the Q&A, after the film's Boston Science Fiction Film Festival premiere, a Harvard physicist in the audience, Dr. Roberto Martinez, jumped up on stage to offer his expertise on the film's science. Yale physics professor, Frank Robinson, was present at the Yale University screening.
 Since it was anecdotal, the Harvard lecture Einstein gave where he described the God Model is not published, however, a very similar diagram appears on page 4 of the textbook " Elementary Modern Physics" by Richard T. Weidner and Robert L. Sells (Allyn and Bacon, Inc., Boston, 7th Printing, May, 1964).

Awards

References

External links 
Einstein's God Model - official website
Einstein's God Model - IMDb

American science fiction films
2016 science fiction films
2010s English-language films
2010s American films